B. gardneri may refer to:

 Banksia gardneri, the prostrate banksia, a shrub species found along the south coast of Western Australia
 Barbosella gardneri, an orchid species

See also 
 Gardneri